The Cathedral of Astorga (Spanish: Catedral de Santa María de Astorga) is a Roman Catholic church in Astorga, Spain. It was declared a national monument in 1931.

The gothic edifice was begun in 1471, within the same walls of its Romanesque predecessors from the 11th-13th centuries. The construction lasted until the 18th century, thus to its original Gothic style appearance were added elements from later styles, such as the Neo-Classicist cloister (18th century), the Baroque towers, capitals and the façade, and the Renaissance portico. With a rectangular layout, with apsidal chapels, very clear and bright, it has an architectural closeness to German Gothic.

The interior houses numerous artworks, such as the Flemish-Spanish retablo of St. Michael, and the large high altar by Gaspar Becerra (1558), considered a masterwork of the Spanish Renaissance sculpture. Other sculptures include the "Purísima" by Gregorio Fernández (1626), "St. John the Baptist and St. Jerome" by Mateo del Prado (17th century) and the "Christ of the Waters" (14th century).

Next to the church is the Neo-medieval Episcopal Palace, designed by Antoni Gaudí.

External links

Official website
The Art of medieval Spain, A.D. 500-1200, an exhibition catalog from The Metropolitan Museum of Art Libraries (fully available online as PDF), which contains material on Astorga Cathedral (no. 70)

18th-century Roman Catholic church buildings in Spain
Roman Catholic cathedrals in Castile and León
Churches in Castile and León
Gothic architecture in Castile and León
Baroque architecture in Castile and León
Buildings and structures in the Province of León
Astorga, Spain